BIL or Bil may refer to:

Mythology

 Bil, a Norse goddess
 Bil (Mandaeism), the Mandaean name for Jupiter

People
 Bil Baird (1904–1987), American puppeteer
 Bil Dwyer (1907-1987), American cartoonist and humorist
 Bil Dwyer (born 1962), American stand-up comedian and game show host
 Bil Herd, computer designer
 Bil Keane (1922–2011), American cartoonist best known for his comic strip The Family Circus
 Bil Marinkovic (born 1973), Austrian blind Paralympic athlete
 Bil Zelman (born 1972), American photographer and director

Transport
 Billingham railway station, Borough of Stockton-on-Tees, England, by station code
 Billings Logan International Airport, by IATA code

Other
 Basic impulse insulation level, electrical term
 BIL (yacht)
 Banque Internationale à Luxembourg, co-owner of Luxair
 Boolean Integrase Logic, a transcriptor based biological equivalent of electronic logic
 British & Irish Lions, a representative touring rugby union team composed of English, Welsh, Irish and Scottish players
 GL Limited, multinational corporation formerly known as Brierley Investments
 brother-in-law.

See also
 Bank Indonesia Liquidity Support
 Beal (disambiguation)
 Beale
 Beall
 Beel (disambiguation)
 Bheel (disambiguation)
 Bhil people